Andres Gonzales (born May 16, 1983) is an American professional golfer.

Professional career
Gonzales has played on the Canadian Tour, Web.com Tour, and PGA Tour. He won the 2009 Saskatchewan Open on the Canadian Tour.  He later won the 2012 Soboba Golf Classic and 2014 Utah Championship on the Web.com Tour.  Gonzales has tallied three top ten finishes on the PGA Tour including a tie for third at the OHL Classic at Mayakoba in 2014.

Personal life
He has attained some popularity due to his unorthodox appearance and prolonged attempts to contact fellow golfer Tiger Woods via Twitter.

Amateur wins
2005 Scratch Players Championship

Professional wins (5)

Web.com Tour wins (2)

Web.com Tour playoff record (0–2)

Canadian Tour wins (1)

Gateway Tour wins (2)
2007 Trilogy Golf Classic
2009 Desert Spring Classic

Results in major championships

CUT = missed the half-way cut
Note: Gonzales only played in the U.S. Open.

Results in The Players Championship

CUT = missed the halfway cut

See also
2010 PGA Tour Qualifying School graduates
2012 Web.com Tour graduates
2014 Web.com Tour Finals graduates
2016 Web.com Tour Finals graduates

References

External links

Profile on UNLV Rebel's official site

American male golfers
Oregon State Beavers men's golfers
UNLV Rebels men's golfers
PGA Tour golfers
Korn Ferry Tour graduates
Golfers from Washington (state)
Sportspeople from Olympia, Washington
1983 births
Living people